Evolution is the sixth studio album by Paul van Dyk released in April 2012. The album features a wide range of collaborations including Arty, Giuseppe Ottaviani, Adam Young, Austin Leeds, Plumb, Johnny McDaid's Fieldwork project, and Sue McLaren.

The album was preceded by a series of singles, each of them accompanied by a music video containing state-of-the-art visual effects. All the other tracks on the album are accompanied by a music video as well. "Verano" featuring producer Austin Leeds is the album's first single, released on the 20 February 2012, followed by the second single "Eternity" on 16 March 2012 which features vocals from Adam Young. "I Don't Deserve You" featuring vocals from Plumb was released several months after the release of the album.

Track listing

References

External links 
 Evolution at Discogs
  

2012 albums
Paul van Dyk albums
Vandit albums